Admir Ćatović (born 5 September 1987) is a Bosnian-Swedish footballer who plays as a striker for Assyriska FF.

Career
Starting his career in the Vasalunds IF youth system, Ćatović moved on to Råsunda IS and eventually was picked up by AIK.

AIK was relegated to Superettan in 2004, and Ćatović took a place in the senior team prior to the 2005 season. However, his appearance on the field was limited to 2 league matches and 2 cup matches, he scored once against Västra Frölunda IF when he gave AIK the lead after nine minutes in a 3–0 victory.

When AIK was promoted back to Allsvenskan, Ćatović did not follow and was released to AIK's Farm team Väsby United. However the club was relegated immediately to Division 1, where he helped the club back by scoring 10 goals. During the 2008 Superettan he helpt Väsby to a 9th position by scoring 6 goals. He was loaned out to Syrianska FC prior to the 2009 season, but had only limited appearances for the club. In 2010 AIK suffered greatly from poor performance and brought Ćatović back to club, he however ended up in the shadows of first Mohamed Bangura and then Teteh Bangura.

Dissatisfied with his secondary role in the team, Ćatović broke his contract with AIK and signed for Assyriska FF. During the season of 2014 he played for KuPs (Kuopio, Finland).

On 28 July 2015, it was confirmed, that Ćatović had signed a season-long contract with Danish 1st Division club FC Fredericia. He left the club in January 2016, when his contract expired.

On 2 February 2017, he moved to the Russian club FC Khimki.

References

External links 
 
 

1987 births
Living people
People from Gacko
Bosnia and Herzegovina emigrants to Sweden
Swedish footballers
Association football forwards
Vasalunds IF players
AIK Fotboll players
AFC Eskilstuna players
Syrianska FC players
Assyriska FF players
Degerfors IF players
Vaasan Palloseura players
IK Frej players
Kuopion Palloseura players
Superettan players
Allsvenskan players
Veikkausliiga players
FC Khimki players
Swedish expatriate footballers
Expatriate footballers in Finland
Expatriate footballers in Russia
Swedish men's futsal players
Swedish international futsal players